Shlomo Smiltiner  (27 November 1915 – 13 August 2015) was an Israeli chess master.

He played thrice for Israel in Chess Olympiads.
 In 1956, at second reserve board in 12th Chess Olympiad in Moscow (+3 –3 =2);
 In 1958, at fourth board in 13th Chess Olympiad in Munich (+8 –4 =3);
 In 1966, at second reserve board in 17th Chess Olympiad in Havana (+3 –2 =4).

References

External links

1915 births
2015 deaths
Israeli Jews
Israeli chess players
Jewish chess players
Chess Olympiad competitors